The Omaha Streetcar is a proposed streetcar in Omaha, Nebraska.

History

Background

The Omaha-Council Bluffs streetcar era began operations in 1868. By 1890, the metropolitan area had  of tracks — more than any city except Boston. The Omaha Traction Company was the dominant private streetcar provider of the time; it was engulfed in repeated labor disputes. By 1955, the city closed its streetcars in favor of buses.

Planning and development 
Planning and research for a new streetcar began between 2008 and 2009. An advanced conceptual engineering plan was first announced in 2014 and revised in 2018 by Metro Transit, with an estimated cost of $170 million. Rep. Don Bacon was unsuccessful in obtaining an $8 million earmark for the project in 2021.

In 2022, a revised plan was announced by Mayor Jean Stothert and the Greater Omaha Chamber of Commerce's Urban Core Committee.  The streetcar will be built, operated, and maintained without a property tax rate increase or sales tax increase. It will run on a  route from Cass to Farnam on South 10th Street, Farnam west to 42nd Street, and back to 10th Street on Harney. The streetcar is expected to be operational in 2026, and free for all riders. Future expansions north, south, and west in Omaha and Council Bluffs, Iowa are also proposed. The proposal was endorsed by Governor of Nebraska Pete Ricketts, Union Pacific Railroad President, chairman and CEO Lance Fritz, and Mayor Matt Walsh of Council Bluffs.

The streetcar is expected to start construction in 2024 and be completed in 2026 alongside the new Mutual of Omaha Headquarters Tower. Investor Warren Buffett, an Omaha resident and owner of Berkshire Hathaway, published a letter to the editor in the Omaha World-Herald to oppose the street project. He cited its cost and inflexibility compared to a bus system.

See also 

 Light rail in the United States
 Streetcars in North America
 Transportation in Omaha

References

External links 
 Official Streetcar Website

Public transportation in Nebraska
Streetcars in Omaha, Nebraska
Streetcars in Nebraska
Proposed public transportation in Nebraska
Proposed railway lines in the United States
2026 in rail transport